Arioch ( ’Aryōḵ) appears in the Book of Genesis as the name of the "King of Ellasar", who participated in the Battle of the Vale of Siddim. The battle is described in Genesis as consisting of four kings, led by Chedorlaomer of Elam (Amraphel, Arioch, Chedorlaomer, and Tidal), engaging in a punitive expedition against five kings of Canaan who rebelled against Chedorlaomer (Bera, Birsha, Shinab, Shemeber, and the king of Bela). The same story is also mentioned in the Book of Jubilees, where Arioch is called "king of Sellasar".

Arioch and Ellasar 
Some historians have placed the area where Arioch ruled in Asia Minor, but theories as to its specific locations differ, with some claiming it was in Pontus while others cite Cappadocia and Antioch. There are also sources which associated Ellasar with the kingdom of Larsa and suggested that Arioch could be one of its kings called Eri-Aku, an Akkadian translation for the name Rim-Sin, where rim meant servant and Sin is the Semitic name of the moon god (Agu or Aku in Akkadian). By the 20th century, this theory became popular so that it was common to identify Arioch with Eriaku — through the alternative reading of either Rim-Sin or his brother Warad-Sin, who were both believed to be contemporary with Hammurabi. Others identify Ellasar with Ilan-Sura which is a city known from second millennium BC Mari archives in the vicinity of north of Mari, and Arioch with Arriwuk who appears in Mari archives as a subordinate of Zimri-Lim.

Adaptations by later writers
Arioch was a name for a fictional demon, and also appears as the name of a demon in many grimoires. Arioch is also named in John Milton's Paradise Lost (vi. 371.) as one of the fallen angels under Satan's command.

Arioch is one of the principal lords of Chaos in several of Michael Moorcock's fantasy series.

References

Book of Genesis people
Fictional demons and devils
Lech-Lecha
Torah monarchs
Book of Jubilees